Stephen Lowe may refer to:
 Stephen Lowe (bishop of Hulme) (born 1944), retired English Anglican bishop
 Stephen Lowe (playwright) (born 1947), English playwright
 Stephen Lowe (born 1953), son and biographer of actor Arthur Lowe
 Stephen Lowe (bishop of Hamilton) (born 1962), Roman Catholic bishop in New Zealand
 Stephen Lowe (cricketer) (born 1981), English cricketer
 Steve Lowe, a character on the soap opera EastEnders

See also
Stephen Low (disambiguation)